The Cerro Plataforma Formation is a sedimentary formation cropping out at Cerro Plataforma south of Puelo Lake in the Andes of Argentine Patagonia. The formation contains marine fossils of bivalves, gastropods and echinoderms.
 
To the southwest in Chile lies the geologically equivalent La Cascada Formation.

References

Further reading 
 

Geologic formations of Argentina
Miocene Series of South America
Neogene Argentina
Sandstone formations
Siltstone formations
Conglomerate formations
Shallow marine deposits
Geology of Chubut Province